Betty Harford (born January 28, 1927) is an American actress. She appeared in numerous classic television shows such as Gunsmoke, The Alfred Hitchcock Hour, The Paper Chase and Dynasty.

Career
Harford appeared in numerous John Houseman theatrical productions and in the High Valley Theater of Iris Tree.

She appeared in episodes of Alfred Hitchcock Presents, Gunsmoke, Dr. Kildare, The Twilight Zone, The Big Valley and The Paper Chase.

In the 1959 film The Wild and the Innocent, Harford was Ms. Forbes, caring after Sandra Dee's character.  Christopher Isherwood found her acting in the 1969 movie Inside Daisy Clover, where she played the sister, Gloria, of Natalie Wood's lead character, as "too much bigger than life, like an actress out of the Moscow Art Theatre."

Harford had the recurring role of cook Hilda Gunnerson in the soap opera Dynasty, appearing in the series throughout its nine-year run from 1981 to 1989, and reprising the part for Dynasty: The Reunion in 1991.

She was Mrs Nottingham, the "ever-efficient secretary" of Professor Charles Kingsfield, in the series The Paper Chase, during its 1978–79 season, and when the show was brought back by Showtime in 1983.

Personal life
Harford was married to California sculptor Oliver Andrews. They had a son they named Chris (born September 29, 1952), and separated in the late 1970s. She lived with Hungarian actor Alex de Naszody, until his death.

References

External links

1927 births
Living people
American television actresses
Actresses from New York City
20th-century American actresses
21st-century American women